Maimetshorapia is an extinct genus of wasp which existed in Botswana during the late Cretaceous period, containing the single species Maimetshorapia africana.

References

Stephanoidea
Prehistoric Hymenoptera genera
Cretaceous insects
Hymenoptera of Africa
Prehistoric insects of Africa